Justice Simon may refer to:

Florent Edouard Simon (1799-1866), associate justice of the Louisiana Supreme Court
James D. Simon (1897–1982), associate justice of the Louisiana Supreme Court 
Seymour Simon (1915–2006), associate justice of the Supreme Court of Illinois

See also
Judge Simon (disambiguation)